George Mahoney Mayberry (24 July 1883 – 21 November 1961) was an Irish track and field athlete who competed in the 1908 Summer Olympics for the United Kingdom of Great Britain and Ireland. He was born in Kenmare and died in Frant. In 1908 he participated in the triple jump event but his result is unknown.

References

External links

1883 births
1961 deaths
British male triple jumpers
Olympic athletes of Great Britain
Athletes (track and field) at the 1908 Summer Olympics
People from Kenmare
Irish male triple jumpers
People from Frant